Greya powelli is a moth of the  family Prodoxidae. It is found in the coastal range between the San Francisco Bay area and the San Gabriel Mountains, and in the south-central Sierra Nevada of California. The habitat consists of slightly moist grassy areas in open oak woodland.

The wingspan is 7–12 mm. The forewings of the females are white, heavily banded with rusty patches into a checker spot pattern. Males have white to pale grey forewings, lightly suffused with a scattering of light brown scales. The hindwings are paler in both sexes.

The larvae feed on Bowlesia incana. Young larvae feed on the developing seeds of their host plant.

References

Moths described in 1992
Prodoxidae
Taxa named by Donald R. Davis (entomologist)